Legislative violence broadly refers to any violent clashes between members of a legislature, often physically, inside the legislature and triggered by divisive issues and tight votes. Such clashes have occurred in many countries across time, and notable incidents still regularly occur.

Although the sight of brawling politicians is incongruous with a legislature's stately image, its occupants, like in any other workplace, are still prone to stress and anger. The confrontational nature of politics, regardless of their location, and the high stakes involved often add to the simmering tensions. 
US Congressman Galusha A. Grow, no stranger to legislative violence, described the precursors thus:

Afghanistan

5 July 2011 
Nazifa Zaki and Hamida Ahmadzai fought in the chamber of the National Assembly over rocket attacks from Pakistan.

19 May 2019 
MPs brawled over the election of a new speaker.

Algeria

30 November 2015 
A tax bill raising rates on electricity, diesel fuel, and 3G cellular service sparked brawls in parliament.

Ancient Rome

March 15, 44 BC 

General and dictator Julius Caesar was famously assassinated by a group of senators on the Ides of March, 44 BC during a meeting of the Roman Senate. The senators, led by Cassius and Brutus and calling themselves Liberatores, had conspired in secret to kill Caesar and considered various ways to do so. Ultimately, they decided to kill him during a meeting of the senate, since only senators would be allowed in the meeting and Caesar would be alone. The senators drafted a fake petition requesting that Caesar hand over power to the Senate; Caesar called a meeting of the Senate to read it. When Caesar met the senators at the Theatre of Pompey, they stabbed him repeatedly with daggers concealed under their togas, killing him. Caesar's assassination led to a civil war for control of the republic, ending ultimately with the rise of Caesar Augustus and the founding of the Roman Empire.

Armenia 
Legislative violence has happened in Armenia.

Austria

Habsburg era
During the era of the Dual Monarchy, the House of Deputies of the Imperial Council of the Cisleithanian (i.e. Austrian) half of the Empire endured frequent outbursts of violence. Mark Twain, writing in Harper's in 1898, observed:

One night, while the customary pandemonium was crashing and thundering along at its best, a fight broke out. It was a surging, struggling, shoulder-to-shoulder scramble. A great many blows were struck. Twice Schönerer lifted one of the heavy ministerial fauteuils – some say with one hand – and threatened members of the Majority with it, but it was wrenched away from him; a member hammered Wolf over the head with the President's bell, and another member choked him; a professor was flung down and belabored with fists and choked; he held up an open penknife as a defense against the blows; it was snatched from him and flung to a distance; it hit a peaceful Christian Socialist who wasn't doing anything, and brought blood from his hand.

Australia

13 February 2019 
Brian Burston and his advisor James Ashby clashed in Parliament House after Burston and One Nation Party leader Pauline Hanson accused each other of sexual harassment.

Bolivia

27 October 2007 
In 2007, a fight broke out in the lower house of the Plurinational Legislative Assembly, the Chamber of Deputies. The fight erupted during a debate over whether or not to try four judges on corruption charges.

Bosnia and Herzegovina

31 July 2019 
Following an intense debate in the Council of the Bosnian-Podrinje Canton in city of Goražde, councilor Daliborka Milović, who was also the president of the Liberal Party, had thrown a plastic water bottle, hitting Edita Velić, a member of the Democratic Front, in the process, who was at the time, the Chairman of the council, after a disagreement on drafting a new law. Following the event, Milović was promptly escorted out of the building by the local municipal police.

23 December 2019 
Draško Stanivuković, a prominent member of the PDP, was initially scolded by Milorad Dodik's right-wing SNSD-dominated club for various provocations aimed at the current government of the Republika Srpska. As an MP, Stanivuković became famous for flamboyant presentations of his ideas, which many at the time deemed provocative. Two days before Christmas, Stanivuković was physically assaulted by Dragan Lukač of SNSD, the current Minister of Interior of the Republic of Srpska since (holding the position since 2014). Moments before the confrontation, Lukač warned Stanivuković to cease his provocations aimed at the government, warning him that he's going to "end up on the floor, just like those little flags he brought along." Following his statement, Lukač had asked Stanivuković, who had by now been walking around the National Assembly hall carrying hand-held NATO flags and distributing them to those present, to approach him, calling him an "ape" in the process. Stanivuković did so, and following a brief exchange words, Lukač proceeded to hit him on the head with his right fist. The event was broadcast live on the Radio Television of the Republic of Srpska. This happened in the wake of events where the Bosnian three-men presidency had unanimously agreed to sign the Reform Program, which is widely speculated to be the undisclosed SMO agreement, which would allow Bosnia and Herzegovina to pursue full membership in NATO. Following the event, Lukač would go on to apologize to the mass public, but not to Stanivuković in particular. The case is currently under an investigation.

Brazil

4 December 1963
The father of the former president Fernando Collor and senator for the State of Alagoas, Arnon de Melo, fired three shots with a .38 caliber revolver against Silvestre Péricles, Senator for Alagoas and Melo's political opponent, who had been threatening him with death. Pericles escaped from the shots, but two bullets hit the senator for the State of Acre, José Kairala, hitting his abdomen. Kairala was quickly rescued and taken to a hospital in Brasília, but later died. Arnon remained in prison until July 1964, when he was acquitted by the Brasília Jury Tribunal, on the grounds that he acted in self-defense.

Canada

5 December 2012 
New Democratic Party House Leader Nathan Cullen attempted to delay the passing of a Conservative budget bill, leading to a threatening confrontation between Conservative Government House Leader Peter Van Loan and NDP leader Tom Mulcair, described in the media as a "near-brawl".

18 May 2016 
Before a vote in the House of Commons Prime Minister Justin Trudeau "manhandled" Conservative Party Opposition Whip Gord Brown and inadvertently elbowed NDP MP Ruth Ellen Brosseau. The incident went on to be known as "Elbowgate" and officially known in the House of Commons as "the matter of the physical molestation of the Member from Berthier—Maskinongé".

China

Hong Kong
A pan-democrat lawmaker threw a glass to CY Leung before a Hong Kong Legislative Council meeting and was charged for common assault.

Two lawmakers who entered the parliament's chamber without being authorized to do so caused a scuffle then the lawmakers tried to read out their oath of office.

Czech Republic

7 February 2019 
Health Minister David Rath and his right-wing rival, Miroslav Macek, fought during a meeting of disgruntled dentists in Prague.

21 January 2021 
Member of Parliament , leader of the far-right Unified – Alternative for Patriots, attacked Deputy Speaker Tomáš Hanzel during the debate on the extension of the state of emergency due to the COVID-19 pandemic. After being reprimanded by Hanzel for not speaking to the topic, Volný started to insult him, and when his microphone was turned off, he approached and confronted the Deputy Speaker trying to use his microphone instead. Other deputies came to help Hanzel; Volný was eventually taken away by the security guard.

Egypt

28 February 2016 

Kamal Ahmed threw a shoe at Tawfik Okasha during a session of parliament for hosting the Israeli ambassador Haim Koren.

14 June 2017 
While Geographer Sayed Al-Husseny was trying to explain that the Gaza Strip is a part of Egypt, parliamentarian Ahmed Tantawi went to the platform and broke Husseny's microphone.

Estonia

5 February 1929 
During a session of the Riigikogu, the Farmers' Assemblies accused Minister of Education and Welfare Leopold Johanson of Socialist Workers' Party of accepting bribes. Artur Tupits of the Farmers' Assemblies then slapped Johanson in the face twice, until the two were separated. Disturbances continued on the next day. Tupits was then arrested for two months. His name inspired a new expression for a brawl in Estonian (tupitsat tegema, similar to the earlier expression tuupi tegema).

European Parliament 
In 1988, when Pope John Paul II addressed the European Parliament, hard-line Ulster loyalist Ian Paisley, then an MEP, denounced him as the Antichrist and was subjected to booing by fellow MEPs who also threw objects at him; Otto von Habsburg was among those who helped physically eject Paisley from the room.

Mike Hookem punched Steven Woolfe in the face at a UK Independence Party conference in 2016.

Georgia

26 December 2014 
A brawl broke out when an argument over the composition of Georgian delegations in international institutions turned violent.

Germany

10 March 1950 
After having been expelled from the Bundestag for an anti-Semitic speech, calling the resistance against Nazi Germany as traitors and general unruly behavior  did not leave the building. Herbert Wehner, Rudolf-Ernst Heiland and some other Members of the SPD found him in a break room giving interviews and repeating what he was banned for, leading to them attacking him. While fleeing, Hedler fell through a glass door and down the stairs and got a laceration on the head as a result. Hedler was member of the German Party (1947), in Nazi-Germany he was Member of the NSDAP. Wehner, Heiland and the other SPD Members were expelled from the Bundestag for ten days as a punishment.

Greece

16 May 2017 
A fight erupted between rival MPs in the Hellenic Parliament.

India

Tamil Nadu 
In January 1988, there was a riot in the Tamil Nadu Legislative Assembly over a vote of majority for V. N. Janaki, who was serving as Chief Minister following the death in December 1987 of her husband M. G. Ramachandran. The All India Anna Dravida Munnetra Kazhagam (ADMK) had split, with most MLAs supporting her and some supporting Jayalalithaa's bid to become Chief Minister instead. The Indian National Congress with its 60 MLAs was able to play "kingmaker". While the Congress-led Central Government in New Delhi ordered them to vote against Janaki, some Congress MLAs chose to resign instead, allowing the Janaki government to survive the majority vote. A riot ensued in the legislature, with members clubbing each other with microphone stands and footwear, which was finally ended by riot police who stormed the legislature and beat up everybody with their batons. The Janaki faction was however dismissed by the Central Government under Article 356 of the Indian Constitution, having survived just 24 days in office. The state was placed under President's rule for a year, until the next scheduled state assembly elections in January 1989.

On 25 March 1989, a riot broke out in the state legislative assembly in Tamil Nadu between members of the ruling Dravida Munnetra Kazhagam party and the now-unified opposition ADMK over the reading of the state budget. In the melee, Durai Murugan tried to disrobe J. Jayalalithaa, Muthuvel Karunanidhi had his sunglasses broken, and the budget was torn up by angry rioters.

Uttar Pradesh 
On 21 October 1997, a riot broke out in the Uttar Pradesh Legislative Assembly with MLAs picking up microphones, chairs, and other items to throw at each other. Security pulled off the tops of desks as a shield for the Speaker.

Maharashtra 
A member of the Maharashtra Legislature was assaulted on 10 November 2009 in the state assembly. One of the members, Abu Azmi, who could not speak Marathi, took the oath in Urdu instead. This was objected to by a right wing party Maharashtra Navnirman Sena, which wanted Marathi to be the official language in the state. Four members of MNS were suspended for four years for disrupting the proceedings of the legislature.

Delhi 

In 2001, the 2001 Indian Parliament attack took place. A group of Lashkar-e-Taiba and Jaish-e-Mohammed terrorists entered Parliament House, New Delhi, using a car with fake labels. They shot dead some security personnel and other staff. The terrorists were shot and killed. Before all this happened, there was some quarrelling inside the Parliament.

Iran 
Scuffles broke out in the Islamic Consultative Assembly after the country's economic and finance minister Masoud Karbasian was sacked.

Iraq 
There has been violence in the Council of Representatives of Iraq.

Kurdish MPs brawled in the Kurdistan Region Parliament over president Masoud Barzani's term.

Israel 
Legislative violence has happened in the Knesset.
 In 1992, in the aftermath of the First Intifada, Jewish and Arab MKs fought over child support payment.
 In 2012, Yisrael Beiteinu MK Anastassia Michaeli threw water at HaAvoda MK Raleb Majadele.
 A fight broke out after Balad MK Haneen Zoabi had called Israel Defense Forces soldiers "murderers". Far-right MKs began shouting for her to be deported to the Hamas-controlled Gaza Strip and Mickey Levy ordered the Knesset's ushers to forcibly remove her from the floor. She returned after claiming to chairman Hamad Amar that she wanted to apologize, only to be removed again and cause more violence after condemning the blockade of the Gaza Strip and calling for another Gaza flotilla raid. Numerous MKs were removed from the plenum or faced discipline from the Knesset Ethics Committee for the incident. On behalf of the Likud government, Ofir Akunis condemned the "insane incitement" but called Zoabi a "traitor", "terrorist", and "neo-fascist" for her speech. The Likud government tried to have Zoabi disqualified for reelection by the Central Elections Committee for the incident, but it was overturned by the Israeli Supreme Court.
 Ksenia Svetlova was caught writing in lipstick on Leah Fadida's window.
 Michal Biran and Haneen Zoabi called Oren Hazan "a pimp".
 Oren Hazan and Ayelet Nahmias-Verbin had a shouting match in the Knesset parking lot.

Also, fights broke out in the Givatayim City Hall in 2003 and 2010.

Italy 
A brawl broke out in the Italian Parliament in 2010 over an issue of funding for new youth social centres.

Japan

17 September 2015 
A brawl broke out in the National Diet on 17 September after the House of Councillors approved legislation for the controversial security bills that would allow the country to send Japan Self-Defense Forces troops to fight abroad for the first time since World War II. Members of the Democratic Party of Japan opposition tried to grab the microphone and stop Masahisa Sato, acting chairman of the upper house special committee, from carrying out the vote in parliament.

Jordan 
There has been violence during sessions of parliament, including one instance where a member was removed from the building after he fired an AK-47 from the hall at a fellow MP.

Kenya 
Lawmakers came to blows in the parliament chamber over a proposed security bill in 2014, while police arrested protesters outside the building.

Wajir East lawmaker Rashid Kassim Amin assaulted Wajir Women Representative Fatuma Gedi.

Kosovo

11 March 2016 
Opposition politicians released tear gas in parliament to obstruct a session in Parliament.

Kuwait

16 June 2016 
A shoe fight started after Hamdan El-Azmi expressed his opposition to the government presenting an amendment to the distribution of electoral constituencies in the new municipal law.

Lebanon

5 October 2015 
Lawmakers were involved in a brawl over disputes during a meeting of a parliamentary committee on energy shortages.

Mexico

1 December 2006 
Hours before the scheduled Oath of Office ceremony for President Felipe Calderón in the Legislative Palace, the Congress of the Union erupted in a brawl. The incident was broadcast on live television. In spite of such events, the ceremony took place. Calderón entered the Congress chamber through a back door directly onto the podium, and in a quick ceremony took the Oath of Office amid jeers. Then, after signing the national anthem which silenced the opposition for a while, he took a quick exit rather than deliver his inaugural address to Congress (the traditional follow-up to the oath taking).

Morocco

11 October 2014
Hamid Chabat scuffled with Aziz Lebbar.

Nepal 
A brawl broke out in the Federal Parliament in 2015 during a debate over the country's new constitution.

Nigeria

22 June 2010 
A fight broke out in the National Assembly after a group of members were suspended for accusing the speaker of corruption.

18 September 2013 
Politicians were involved in a fight after a group from the People's Democratic Party (PDP) tried to address parliament.

North Macedonia 

An ethnic Albanian Democratic Party of Albanians opposition party announced it was boycotting parliament after a fist fight broke out in the chamber between its member Orhan Ibrahimi and Rexhail Ismaili from the rival ruling Democratic Union for Integration.

Pakistan

26 January 2017 
The National Assembly of Pakistan witnessed violence when members of the ruling party Pakistan Muslim League (N) and the opposition party Pakistan Tehreek-e-Insaf came to blows with one another over the Panama Papers case. Amid scuffle and heated arguments, MPs slapped, kicked and pushed each other in a rare clash in the house.

6 November 2018 
Elected members of the ruling hall were caught on camera pushing, manhandling and even dealing blows at each other.

The focus of the fight was Asia Bibi, a woman saved from the hangman by a ruling of the Supreme Court of Pakistan, which ordered her release after she spent eight years on death row for conviction under blasphemy laws.

4 February 2021 
Parliament descended into violence with both the Opposition and treasury benches brawling with each other. Later, show cause notices were issued to three members regarding their involvement in the "unpleasant incident" that took place during parliamentary proceedings.

Peru 

The Congress of the Republic of Peru has seen many violent acts through the years.

28 June 1988 
When Peru had a bicameral legislature, member of congress Rómulo León (APRA) tried to grab and punch his colleague Fernando Olivera (FIM) because Olivera was accusing him of having secret bank accounts in a Swiss bank. He was suspended for 120 days from Congress.

27 August 1998 
After Alberto Fujimori dissolved Congress and approved a unicameral legislature, Congressman Javier Diez Canseco (PS) decided to finish a heated discussion with a Fujimorist congressman with a punch in the jaw. He was suspended for 120 days from the legislature for the violent act.

26 July 2000 
On the oath day, Congressmen threw coins to their colleague Roger Cáceres because they were accusing him of being a turncoat for moving to the government party Peru 2000. His son Roger Cáceres Pérez (also a Congressman) insulted the coin throwers.

August 2006 
Union for Peru Congresswomen Nancy Obregón and Elsa Malpartida did not approve the Peru–United States Trade Promotion Agreement. For that reason, they tried to escape punching and kicking the Congress security. They were suspended for 120 days from the legislature for the violent acts.

19 May 2011 
Congressman Víctor Andrés García Belaúnde (AP) accused his colleague Luis Wilson (PAP) of having members of his family working for a national hospital with high salaries. Luis Wilson started to defy García Belaúnde's accusations, then went to his desk and started insulting and tried to fight with him, but his colleagues prevented it.

Philippines 
In September 2016, Senator Antonio Trillanes IV, a former military officer who led 2 coup attempts (Oakwood Mutiny and Manila Peninsula siege) during the administration of President Gloria Macapagal Arroyo, turned off the microphone of his fellow Senator (former Partymate) Alan Peter Cayetano during a televised Senate hearing on the Philippine war on drugs and engaged in January 2017 with Senator Juan Miguel Zubiri in near fistfighting, after the Kilusang Pagbabago Coalition Members rejected Trillanes' resolution for investigation for the Bureau of Immigration Bribery scandal.

In the lower house, Representative Prospero Pichay Jr. got into a heated argument with fellow legislator Robert "Ace" Barbers" during a hearing over constitutional amendments on October 2016. After the hearing was suspended, Barbers walked towards Pichay. Reporters covering the forum overheard the two congressmen hurl expletives at each other. Barbers then pointed at the face of Pichay, who was seated. Pichay pushed away the other lawmaker’s hand, then stood up. Their colleagues quickly stood between them as they tried to push each other, and managed to break up the fight.

South Africa

17 May 2016 
Members of the Economic Freedom Fighters party became engaged in a brawl with security guards after attempting to prevent President Jacob Zuma from addressing parliament.

5 April 2019 
Before the 2019 general election, members of the EFF and Black First Land First parties began hitting each other and throwing chairs.

South Korea
There have been several events of legislative violence in the National Assembly of South Korea; often the politicians who are involved in such violence do not receive criminal penalties under the civil laws.

2 March 1998 
During a vote to approve Kim Jong-pil as Prime Minister, Grand National Party legislators submitted blank ballots to demonstrate their disapproval. A fight broke out after supporters of the Democratic ruling coalition of Kim Dae-jung demanded that the vote be declared void.

12 March 2004 
During a National Assembly vote on the motion to impeach President Roh Moo-hyun, supporters of the President openly clashed with opposition MPs for 20 minutes in an effort to stop the vote (which was in favor of impeachment) from being finalized.

22 July 2009 
A brawl broke out as the National Assembly passed three bills that is set to reform the media industry. Opposition MPs blocked the Speaker Kim Hyong-o from entering the room to pass the bills while both sides clashed. The bills were eventually passed by the Deputy Speaker.

8 December 2010 
A brawl broke out as the Grand National Party forcefully passed the year 2011 budget bill in advance without the presence of the opposition parties.

22 November 2011 
A brawl broke out as the National Assembly ratified the country's Free-Trade Agreement (FTA) with the United States. Opposition lawmakers used tear gas in the parliament. The ruling Grand National Party (GNP) managed to force it through without amount of violence that was expected.

Spain 

On 23 February 1981, Lieutenant-Colonel Antonio Tejero led 200 armed Civil Guard officers into the Congress of Deputies during the vote to elect Leopoldo Calvo-Sotelo as Prime Minister. The officers held the parliamentarians and ministers hostage for 18 hours, during which time King Juan Carlos I denounced the coup in a televised address, calling for rule of law and the democratic government to continue. Though shots were fired, the hostage-takers surrendered the next morning with no casualties.

Sri Lanka
Legislative violence has happened in the Parliament of Sri Lanka.

Suriname

13 December 2007 
Chairman of the National Assembly Paul Somohardjo (PL) and representatives Ronnie Brunswijk (ABOP) and Rashid Doekhie (NDP) were involved in a fistfight on the assembly floor, after the latter accused Somohardjo of involvement with alleged corruption at the Ministry of Spatial Planning.

Taiwan 
The Taiwanese Legislative Yuan is probably the most notable modern example of legislative violence. In the history of the Legislative Yuan, numerous violent acts have occurred during parliamentary sessions. It is popularly referred to locally as "Legislator Brawling". In 1995, the Legislative Yuan was presented with the Ig Nobel Prize Peace Award, for "demonstrating that politicians gain more by punching, kicking and gouging each other than by waging war against other nations".

7 April 1988 
The first brawl in the history of the Legislative Yuan. While speaker Liu Kuo-tsai was counting votes on a budget proposal which passed, Ju Gau-jeng jumped onto the speaker's podium, followed by Jaw Shaw-kong, who was attempting to stop Ju. Throughout the altercation, Liu continued counting votes.

28 March 2001 
Lo Fu-chu scuffled with Diane Lee during a committee meeting.

23 March 2004 
A serious scuffle broke out between the ruling Democratic Progressive Party and opposition Kuomintang members after an argument over vote recounts from the presidential election, when opposition leader Lien Chan accused President Chen Shui-bian of rigging the vote.

7 May 2004 
Legislators Chu Hsing-yu and William Lai got into a brawl over legislative procedures. TV stations showed Zhu grabbing Lai and trying to wrestle him onto a desk. He then tried to headbutt his colleague before jabbing him in the stomach. The brawl resulted in having a traffic policeman called into the chamber to test Zhu's alcohol level, after he was accused of being drunk. The tests showed no sign of alcohol influence.

26 October 2004 
During a debate on a military hardware purchase ordinance, the opposition and ruling party engaged in a food fight after a disagreement broke out.

30 May 2006 
Amid a proposal about creating direct transport links with the People's Republic of China, DPP deputy Wang Shu-hui snatched the written proposal and shoved it into her mouth. Opposition members failed to get her to cough it up by pulling her hair. She later spat the proposal out and tore it up. This was the third time that the DPP's actions had stopped a vote over the issue.

During the incident another DPP member, spat at an opposition member.

8 May 2007 
Two dozen members overwhelmed the Speaker's podium, which became a free-for-all between the ruling (DPP) and opposition (KMT) parties with punches and sprayed water, requiring at least one hospitalization. The fight was over an alleged delay of the annual budget.

25 June 2013 
Angry legislators wrestled, splashed water, and bit each other in a brawl over a controversial capital gains tax on share trading.

13 to 14 July 2017 
Legislators brawled on two consecutive days over a controversial $420 billion infrastructure spending plan, which the opposition (headed by the KMT) claims to benefit cities and counties faithful to the current President's ruling party, the DPP. They also claim that the plan has been devised to secure support for the party ahead of next year's regional elections.

On 13 July, Taiwanese Premier Lin Chuan was prevented from delivering his report on the budget after a water balloon was thrown towards him. This resulted in him leaving the chamber and causing the session to come to a halt. On the following day, opposition lawmakers occupied the chamber and raised large padded office chairs above their heads, surrounded the podium and tussled with rival legislators to prevent Mr Lin from presenting the report once more as water balloons were thrown. This resulted in the early suspension of the parliamentary session.

27 November 2020 
Legislators from the Kuomintang party threw pig guts and brawled with other lawmakers as they tried to stop the premier, Su Tseng-chang, from taking questions regarding the easing of US pork imports.

Thailand

30 May 2012 
There has been legislative violence in the National Assembly of Thailand.

Tunisia

16 January 2019 
Violent clashes between members of the Assembly of the Representatives of the People.

7 December 2020 
Members of the far-right Al Karama Coalition assaulted lawmakers from the Democratic Bloc. One MP had a bleeding face, another appeared unconscious. Reason for the fight reportedly was a misogynistic statement by Karama's deputy Mohammed Affes from the week before.

18 June 2021 
Abir Moussi, the outspoken leader of the opposition Al-Dustur al-Hurr party, was slapped and kicked as she was filming a parliamentary session on her mobile phone.

Turkey 
There has been legislative violence during Grand National Assembly sessions, including:
Fevzi Sihanlioglu died of a heart attack during a fistfight in 2001.
Politicians fought over cram schooling in 2014.
Five politicians, including Mahmut Tanal and Ertuğrul Kürkçü, were injured during a fight over police power in 2015.
Fatma Kaplan Hürriyet was filming a debate using her mobile phone when Mustafa Elitaş strangled her in 2017.
Politicians fought during debates over a Constitutional Commission in 2016.
Politicians fought over constitutional amendments in 2017.
Müslüm Doğan and Mahmut Toğrul had to seek medical attention after a parliamentary row over the cross-border offensive on Afrin, Syria in 2018 took a violent turn.
A fist-fight erupted in parliament  in 2018 after lawmakers approved changes to the country's electoral rules that critics say are aimed at helping President Recep Tayyip Erdoğan consolidate power.
Lawmakers fought over HDP lawmaker Ahmet Şık's speech.
AKP lawmaker  punched HDP lawmaker Tuma Çelik during a brawl.
Garo Paylan, a member of the HDP, was attacked by AKP members as the parliament's Constitutional Commission was debating whether to strip pro-Kurdish deputies of their immunity.
Mansur Yavaş met in Ankara with metropolitan municipality officials. Yavaş interrupted his speech and abandoned the lectern, trying to prevent a confrontation between the AKP, CHP, MHP and İYİ Party councilors in 2019.
 Parliament members fought over the military intervention in Idlib in the Syrian Civil War in 2020. 
A fight broke out between MPs during a debate on government control over the appointment of judicial officials.
 A brawl between female MPs erupted in 2021 during budget talks after ruling Justice and Development Party (AKP) deputy Bahar Ayvazoğlu targeted the main opposition Republican People's Party (CHP) MPs and its leader Kemal Kılıçdaroğlu throughout her speech.

Uganda

26 September 2017 
Lawmakers of parliament brawled during a plenary session after the parliament speaker allowed a constitutional amendment to be presented to MPs. The amendment centered on the age-limit issue on the re-election of President Yoweri Museveni who was then 73 years old and the limit for re-election wascapped at 75. A member stood on a table and threw a chair at the flag of the president and was pulled down and punched up. Metal sticks and chairs were used as weapons. Museveni was allowed to campaign in the 2021 Ugandan general election.

Ukraine 
The Verkhovna Rada is famous for its common and violent fights, and Verkhovna Rada meetings are often called a "government boxing match". Brawls are very common in the Verkhovna Rada due to the high number of insults and extreme actions in the chamber.

27 April 2010 
A debate on extending Russia's lease of the Sevastopol Naval Base in the Black Sea in exchange for a €30 billion discount on Russian natural gas descended into a mass brawl, involving smoke bombs, eggs and general fighting among members. The Speaker had to be escorted from the chamber, covered by umbrellas.

24 May 2012 
Violent scuffles broke out during a debate over a bill which would allow the official use of the Russian language in parts of the country.

14 August 2014 
Two MPs, Oleh Lyashko and Oleksandr Shevchenko, got into an argument on the floor. Shevchenko accused Lyashko, who had built an image as a combative opponent of pro-Russian separatists, of never having visited the separatist eastern region. The argument eventually led to Shevchenko punching Lyashko in the face.

14 November 2016 
Yuriy Boyko, of the centre-left Opposition Bloc, punched Oleh Lyashko in the face after the left-wing Radical Party member purportedly accused him of being a "Kremlin agent".

20 December 2018 

A brawl broke out after opposition politician Nestor Shufrych tore down a poster of oligarch and politician Viktor Medvedchuk.

United Kingdom 

In the House of Commons of the United Kingdom, the government and the opposition are separated by red lines drawn on the carpet. The red lines in front of the two sets of benches are two sword-lengths apart (or a little more than two sword-lengths apart); a Member is traditionally not allowed to cross the line during debates, supposedly because the Member might then be able to attack an individual on the opposite side. These procedures were made because the Members were allowed to carry weapons into the House in its founding days.

4 April 1938 
During a debate about the Spanish Civil War, Conservative MP Robert Bower told Jewish Labour MP Emanuel Shinwell to "go back to Poland". Shinwell walked across the floor of the House and struck Bower in the face, before turning to the Speaker, apologising and walking out of the chamber. Bower also then apologised to the Speaker, and no disciplinary action was taken against either MP.

31 January 1972 
During a dispute over the conduct of British Army soldiers on Bloody Sunday on the day before, Independent Socialist MP Bernadette Devlin punched the Conservative Party Home Secretary Reginald Maudling. Her aggression was in response to the comments made by Maudling, who was maintaining that the 1st Battalion, Parachute Regiment had fired at the protesters in self-defence, contrary to the testimonies of civilian eyewitnesses (including Devlin herself). She argued that she was being denied the right to speak. Her actions resulted in her being banned from the House of Commons of the United Kingdom for six months.

27 May 1976 
In the aftermath of a rancorous debate with Labour MPs over the Aircraft and Shipbuilding Industries Bill, Conservative Michael Heseltine was enraged by a group who began singing The Red Flag. He seized the chamber's ceremonial mace and brandished it over his head, but was restrained by Jim Prior, and after his departure legislative action was suspended for the day.

19 October 2022 

During opposition day, the Labour Party tabled a motion to ban fracking across the United Kingdom. A ban on fracking had been a key promise of the Conservative Party's winning 2019 general election manifesto under former leader Boris Johnson, and many Conservative MP's and voters were vocally opposed to fracking. However Prime Minister Liz Truss, who had recently been elected party leader by the Conservative Party membership with very little support from MP's, personally supported fracking and instructed MP's to vote against the proposal, claiming that the vote was a motion of confidence in the government and threatening that any Conservative MP who supported the ban would have the whip withdrawn (i.e. be expelled from the Parliamentary party and sit as an independent). Minutes prior to the vote taking place, the Minister of State for Climate Graham Stuart announced that it was not a vote of confidence and he would support the ban. This led to chaos among Conservative MP's, and party whips are alleged to have physically manhandled MP's towards the "No" voting lobby, in one of the few examples of violence between members of the same party. The motion was defeated but forty Conservative MP's abstained from the vote. Liz Truss resigned as leader of the Conservative Party the following day, and was replaced as Prime Minister on the 25th October 2022 by former Chancellor Rishi Sunak, after the shortest tenure in British political history. Sunak quickly reinstituted the government moratorium on fracking, despite having previously voiced support for the practice.

United States

15 February 1798 

Federalist Congressman Roger Griswold of Connecticut attacked Democratic-Republican Party Representative Matthew Lyon of Vermont with a hickory walking stick in the chambers of the United States House of Representatives. Griswold struck Lyon repeatedly about the head, shoulders and arms, while Lyon attempted to shield himself from the blows. Lyon then turned and ran to the fireplace, took up a pair of metal tongs, and having armed himself thus returned to the engagement. Griswold then tripped Lyon and struck him in the face while he lay on the ground, at which point the two were separated. After a break of several minutes, however, Lyon unexpectedly pursued Griswold again with the tongs, and the brawl was re-ignited.

The two men had a prior history of conflict. On 30 January of that year, Griswold had publicly insulted Lyon by calling him a coward, and Lyon had retaliated by spitting in Griswold's face. As a result of Lyon's actions in that case, he became the first Congressman to have charges filed against him with that body's ethics committee, although he escaped censure through a vote in the House.

4 December 1837 
John Wilson, the speaker of the Arkansas House of Representatives and president of the Arkansas Real Estate Bank, stabbed Representative J. J. Anthony to death during a legislative dispute on the floor of the chamber. Anthony had suggested that bounties for the killing of wolves be administered by the president of the state bank, a responsibility comically beneath an official of Wilson's stature. Incensed, he drew a bowie knife and attacked Anthony, who was unable to defend himself despite drawing a knife of his own. Although Wilson was expelled from his office, he was later acquitted of murder.

22 May 1856 

Congressman Preston Brooks of South Carolina famously assaulted Charles Sumner of Massachusetts for a speech of his, saying Brooks' cousin, Senator Andrew Butler of South Carolina, took "a mistress who, though ugly to others, is always lovely to him; though polluted in the sight of the world, is chaste in his sight—I mean, the harlot, Slavery." According to Hoffer (2010), "It is also important to note the sexual imagery that recurred throughout the oration, which was neither accidental nor without precedent. Abolitionists routinely accused slaveholders of maintaining slavery so that they could engage in forcible sexual relations with their slaves." Sumner's own adopted daughter Mary Mildred Williams was a white-appearing girl born into slavery who was the descendant of such a relationship before being freed with the help of Sumner.

Brooks was infuriated and intended to challenge Sumner to a duel. After having consulted with fellow South Carolina Congressman Laurence Keitt on the situation, Brooks and Keitt decided that Sumner had the social status of a "drunkard" and was thus unworthy of the traditional challenge to a duel. Brooks (accompanied by Keitt), approached and confronted Sumner as he sat writing at his desk in the almost empty Senate chamber. As Sumner began to stand up, Brooks began beating Sumner severely on the head with a thick gutta-percha cane with a gold head before he could reach his feet. Sumner was knocked down and trapped under the heavy desk (which was bolted to the floor), but Brooks continued to bash Sumner until he ripped the desk from the floor. By this time, Sumner was blinded by his own blood, and he staggered up the aisle and collapsed, lapsing into unconsciousness. Brooks continued to beat the motionless Sumner until he broke his cane, then quietly left the chamber. Several other senators attempted to help Sumner, but were blocked by Keitt, who had jumped into the aisle, brandishing a pistol and shouting, "Let them be!" Keitt was censured for his actions and resigned in protest, but was overwhelmingly re-elected to his seat by his South Carolina constituency within a month. For several decades following, Senators often carried walking canes and even revolvers in the Senate Chamber, fearing a similar assault.

5 February 1858 
Congressman Laurence M. Keitt of South Carolina was involved in another incident of legislative violence less than two years later, starting a massive brawl on the House floor during a tense late-night debate. Keitt became offended when Pennsylvania Congressman (and later Speaker of the House) Galusha A. Grow stepped over to the Democratic side of the House chamber while delivering an anti-slavery speech. Keitt dismissively interrupted Grow's speech to demand he sit down, calling him a "black Republican puppy". Grow indignantly responded by telling Keitt that "No negro-driver shall crack his whip over me". Keitt became enraged and went for Grow's throat, shouting that he would "choke him for that". A large brawl involving approximately 50 representatives erupted on the House floor, ending only when a missed punch from Rep. Cadwallader Washburn of Wisconsin upended the hairpiece of Rep. William Barksdale of Mississippi. The embarrassed Barksdale accidentally replaced the wig backwards, causing both sides to erupt in spontaneous laughter. Keitt would later die of wounds following the Battle of Cold Harbor while fighting for the Confederacy.

5 April 1860 
During an anti-slavery speech by Illinois Republican Owen Lovejoy on the floor of the U.S. House of Representatives on 5 April 1860, Lovejoy condemned the Democratic Party for its racist views and steadfast support of slavery. As Lovejoy gave his speech condemning the evils of slavery, several of the Democrats present in the audience, such as Roger Atkinson Pryor, grew irate and incensed over Lovejoy's anti-slavery remarks and threatened him with physical harm, brandishing pistols and canes, with several Republicans rushing to Lovejoy's defense.

24 February 1887 
The Indiana General Assembly experienced a massive brawl between Democrats and Republicans in the Indiana Senate and Indiana House of Representatives. The event began as an attempt by Democratic Governor Isaac P. Gray to be elected to the United States Senate and his own party's attempt to thwart him. Gray was a former Republican who had been elected Governor by popular vote but was scorned as a turncoat by his new party, who maneuvered desperately (and unsuccessfully) to try to prevent his eligibility for the Senate seat. When Gray went over the head of the Democrats in arranging a midterm election for a new Lieutenant Governor, Republican Robert S. Robertson was elected with a majority of the popular vote, a situation the Democrats refused to accept despite a ruling from the Indiana Supreme Court. The matter came to a head when Robertson attempted to enter the Senate chamber to be sworn in and take his seat presiding over the session; he was attacked, beaten, and thrown bodily from the chamber by the Democrats, who then locked the chamber door, beginning four hours of intermittent mass brawling that spread throughout the Indiana Statehouse. The fight ended only after Republicans and Democrats began brandishing pistols and threatening to kill each other and the Governor was forced to deploy the Indianapolis Police Department to restore order. Subsequently, the Republican controlled House of Representatives refused to communicate with the Democratic Senate, ending the legislative session and leading to calls for United States Senators to be elected by popular vote.

20 February 1902 
During a debate on a bill dealing with the Philippine Islands, Senator Benjamin Tillman of South Carolina accused Senator John L. McLaurin of South Carolina of "treachery" for siding with the Republicans in support of Philippine annexation, and alleged that McLaurin had been granted control of government patronage in South Carolina. Upon receiving word of this statement, McLaurin entered the Senate Chamber and denounced Tillman, upon which Tillman attacked him. During the fight, other senators were hit by the punches. As a result, the Senate went into closed session to debate the matter. Both senators apologized to the Senate, but almost came to blows immediately thereafter. On 28 February, the Senate voted 54 to 12, with 22 abstentions, to censure both Tillman and McLaurin. McLaurin did not seek re-election, while Tillman served in the Senate until 1918.

4 March 1985 
On the House of Representatives chamber floor, Democrat Thomas Downey of New York confronted Robert Dornan, a California Republican, and Dornan grabbed Downey's tie in response. Downey approached Dornan in response to a speech Dornan had given two days earlier before the Conservative Political Action Conference, in which he called Downey a "draft-dodging wimp" because of Downey's repeated denouncement of US-backed anti-government Contras rebels in Nicaragua. During the Vietnam War, Downey received a medical deferment from the draft because of a perforated eardrum. Downey had also been active in protesting the war. The Dornan-Downey beef originated two years earlier, when Downey spoke against Dornan's nomination for a position at the Arms Control and Disarmament Agency.

The Dornan speech was made on Saturday, 2 March. On Monday afternoon, 4 March, Downey confronted Dornan, attracting dozens of viewers. Dornan claims Downey grabbed him by the shoulder and turned him around, asking if he had actually called him a wimp. Dornan answered "I did and you are." The exchange became heated, and at some point Dornan accused Downey of having cost him the job two years earlier. According to Downey, as he began to walk away, Dornan grabbed him by the tie and collar and threatened him with "bodily harm." Dornan claimed he was just straightening Downey's tie knot, saying later, "I like all the members to look elegant on the floor, you know." Dornan, according to himself and other witnesses, then told Downey to "get out of my face." After, Downey went to the Speaker of the House Tip O'Neill to tell him what had happened.

After the incident, Downey released a statement and stated through a spokesman that he would not speak to reporters "until Dornan apologizes." His spokesman also said that Downey was considering filing a complaint with the House Sergeant at Arms. Several witnesses spoke about the incident. Democratic Congressman Mike Lowry said, "Dornan grabbed Downey roughly by the collar, and I mean aggressively. None of this straighten-the-tie baloney. And he told Downey, 'Don't let me catch you off the floor, where you are protected by the sergeant at arms.' I really think Downey restrained himself." Republican Representative Chris Smith of New Jersey, who witnessed the altercation, said, "I found it humorous that Downey had to run up to the Speaker when it was over to tell all. It was like a little classroom act . . . Very childish . . . I think he's made much to-do about nothing."

The day after the incident, House Speaker Tip O'Neill condemned the behavior, and said he told Dornan, "You can settle it on the street, but don't settle it on the House floor." He also told reporters that "discipline" would ensue if "anything like that" happened again. That day, Downey stated again, "Congressman Dornan owes me and the House of Representatives an apology." Dornan responded, "Apologize for what? For calling him a wimp? I am willing to concede that perhaps he just walks, talks and acts like a little arrogant wimp. But maybe it's disinformation. Maybe he really wears a black leather jacket by night that I don't know about."

7 June 2007 
During the final day of the 2007 regular session of the Alabama State Senate Republican Sen. Charles Bishop of Jasper punched Democratic Sen. Lowell Barron of Fyffe in the head after the latter allegedly called the former a "son of a bitch". The two were then pulled apart by bystanders in the room.

15 June 2011 
During a vote of California budget state Democrat Assemblymen Warren Furutani and Republican Don Wagner broke out in a fight over a comment Wagner made that Furutani deemed offensive.

15 December 2015 
A bloody backroom brawl between the mayor and a council member at a city council meeting in Birmingham, Alabama.

29 May 2017 
During a contentious 2017 Texas House of Representatives session, a minor altercation was observed after Republican State Representative Matt Rinaldi was pushed and received personal death threats. The incident occurred after Rinaldi called U.S Immigration and Customs Enforcement when a large crowd of protesters, in opposition to the sanctuary cities ban, disrupted the legislative proceedings. Representative Poncho Nevárez, Democratic Party member, admitted to laying hands on Rinaldi amid the fierce debates, but no arrests were made by Texas DPS.

Venezuela

24 January 1848 

After almost two decades of continuous clashes, a brawl on 24 January 1848 at the headquarters of the Congress in Caracas between Conservatives and Liberals, leading to four deaths.

10 February 2011 
Deputy  protested the presence of a boisterous group of Chavistas in the audience.

30 April 2013 

During a session of the National Assembly pro-government and opposition deputies got into a fight. The origin of the discussion had to do with the rejection by National Assembly president Diosdado Cabello to give members of the opposition a right to speak.

5 July 2017 

Colectivos and supporters of President Nicolás Maduro stormed the Palacio Federal Legislativo on Independence Day, assaulting many members of the opposition-led National Assembly. At least 12 opposition legislators and their staff were injured as a result of the attack.

Yugoslavia 
On June 20, 1928, Puniša Račić, a Montenegrin Serb leader of the People's Radical Party (NRS) shot and killed Croatian Peasant Party (HSS) representatives Pavle Radić and Đuro Basariček and HSS leader Stjepan Radić, who died of his injuries two months later, during a highly-charged session aggravated by ethic tensions on the floor of parliament. He was tried and handed a 60-year sentence, which was immediately reduced to twenty years. He served most of his sentence under house arrest and was killed by the Yugoslav Partisans in October 1944.

See also 
Political violence
Workplace violence

Further reading

References

External links 
The 8 July 2006 version of this article uses the translation of the corresponding Chinese-language Wikipedia article.
Causes and Possible Solutions to Brawling in the Ukrainian Parliament
Huge brawls in legislatures, explained
When politicians fight: Making sense of physical violence in national legislatures
Explaining Physical Violence in Parliaments

Violence
Workplace violence
Political violence
Politics-related lists